Mid Island-Pacific Rim is a provincial electoral district for the Legislative Assembly of British Columbia, Canada that was created in the 2015 redistribution from parts of Alberni-Pacific Rim and Comox Valley. It was first contested in the 2017 election.

Demographics

History

Election results

External links 
Hi-Res Map (pdf)

References

British Columbia provincial electoral districts on Vancouver Island
Port Alberni